|}

The Prix Chaudenay is a Group 2 flat horse race in France open to three-year-old thoroughbreds. It is run at Longchamp over a distance of 3,000 metres (about 1⅞ miles), and it is scheduled to take place each year in late September or early October.

History
The event was established in 1875, and it was originally called the Prix de l'Espérance. It took place in spring, and served as a trial for the Grand Prix de Paris.

The Prix de l'Espérance was abandoned throughout World War I, with no running from 1915 to 1918. During World War II, it was contested at Maisons-Laffitte in 1943, and Le Tremblay in 1944 and 1945.

The present system of race grading was introduced in 1971, and the Prix de l'Espérance was initially classed at Group 3 level. It was promoted to Group 2 status in 1987, and from this point it was staged in late June or early July.

The race was renamed in memory of Hubert de Chaudenay (1903–1989), a former president of the Société d'Encouragement, in 1990. Hubert's father Jean had been similarly honoured by the naming of the Prix Jean de Chaudenay.

The Prix Hubert de Chaudenay was run at Maisons-Laffitte in 1997 and 1998. It returned to Longchamp and was moved to the Saturday of Prix de l'Arc de Triomphe weekend in 1999. The latter race is traditionally held on the first Sunday of October.

The title of the race was shortened to Prix Chaudenay in 2004, when the Prix Jean de Chaudenay was discontinued. It now honours both father and son, Jean and Hubert de Chaudenay.

Records
Leading jockey (4 wins):
 Charles Semblat – Badari (1926), Passaro (1929), Raeburn (1931), Foxhound (1939)
 Roger Poincelet – Suez (1949), Altipan (1957), Sempervivum (1961), Parabellum (1966)
 Maxime Garcia – Malar (1955), Vattel (1956), Tello (1958), Chrysler (1960)
 Yves Saint-Martin – Waldmeister (1964), Cheik (1965), Largny (1970), Chawn (1975)
 Alain Lequeux – Chem (1982), Rutheford (1983), Rivlia (1985), Tabayaan (1987)
 Thierry Jarnet – Justice (1991), Dajraan (1992), Northern Spur (1994), Affidavit (1995)
 Olivier Peslier – Tarator (1996), Vertical Speed (1997), Amilynx (1999), Epitre (2000)
 Christophe Soumillon – Behkara (2003), Shamdala (2005), Valirann (2013), Vazirabad (2015)

Leading trainer (12 wins):
 André Fabre – Rutheford (1983), Justice (1991), Dajraan (1992), Northern Spur (1994), Affidavit (1995), Vertical Speed (1997), Amilynx (1999), Epitre (2000), Morozov (2002), Reefscape (2004), Coastal Path (2007), Doha Dream (2016)

Leading owner (5 wins):
 Édouard de Rothschild – Predicateur (1912), Mont Blanc (1922), Camping (1933), Bokbul (1935), Ginko Biloba (1937)
 HH Aga Khan IV – Tabayaan (1987), Behkara (2003), Shamdala (2005), Manighar (2009), Shankardeh (2011)

Winners since 1980

Earlier winners

 1875: Salvator
 1876:
 1877: Nonancourt
 1878: La Creole
 1879: Nubienne
 1880: Gobsec
 1881: Patchouli
 1882: Mademoiselle de Senlis
 1883: Kara Kalpak
 1884:
 1885:
 1886:
 1887: Barbeau
 1888: Amiral / Punch
 1889: Vasistas
 1890: Mirabeau
 1891: Naviculaire
 1892: Cleanthe
 1893: Diavolo
 1894: Toujours
 1895:
 1896: Champaubert
 1897: Parasol
 1898: Gourgouran
 1899: Velasquez
 1900: Theobard
 1901: Friso
 1902:
 1903: Pervat
 1904: Le Lys
 1905: Fawn
 1906: Storm
 1907: Chanoine
 1908: Five O'Clock
 1909: Caroubier
 1910: Rasibus
 1911: Sea Lord
 1912: Predicateur
 1913: Siva
 1914: Rollon
 1915–18: no race
 1919: Insensible
 1920: Saint Pol
 1921: Binic
 1922: Mont Blanc
 1923: Filibert de Savoie
 1924: Dauphin
 1925: Erofite
 1926: Badari
 1927: Bouda
 1928: Syram
 1929: Passaro
 1930: Saint Antoine
 1931: Raeburn
 1932: Roi du Jour
 1933: Camping
 1934: Cerealiste
 1935: Bokbul
 1936: Le Vizir
 1937: Ginko Biloba
 1938: Six Avril
 1939: Foxhound
 1940: Labrador
 1941: Clodoche
 1942: Le Nuage
 1943: L'Aretin
 1944: Deux Pour Cent
 1945:
 1946:
 1947: Morkandor
 1948:
 1949: Suez
 1950: Pan
 1951: Stymphale
 1952: Magnific
 1953: Nordiste
 1954: Yorick
 1955: Malar
 1956: Vattel
 1957: Altipan
 1958: Tello
 1959: Buisson D'Argent
 1960: Chrysler
 1961: Sempervivum
 1962: Pegomas
 1963: Rheinfall
 1964: Waldmeister
 1965: Cheik
 1966: Parabellum
 1967: Pointille
 1968: no race
 1969: Nonancourt
 1970: Largny
 1971: Royaltex
 1972: Lassalle
 1973: Rasgavor
 1974: Sagaro
 1975: Chawn
 1976: Secret Man
 1977: Montorselli
 1978: Brave Johnny
 1979: Soleil Noir

See also
 List of French flat horse races
 Recurring sporting events established in 1875 – this race is included under its original title, Prix de l'Espérance.

References

 France Galop / Racing Post:
 galop.courses-france.com:
 1967–1979, 1980–present

 france-galop.com – A Brief History: Prix Chaudenay.
 galopp-sieger.de – Prix Chaudenay (ex Prix de l'Espérance).
 horseracingintfed.com – International Federation of Horseracing Authorities – Prix Chaudenay (2018).
 pedigreequery.com – Prix Chaudenay – Longchamp.

Flat horse races for three-year-olds
Longchamp Racecourse
Horse races in France